is a railway station in the city of Nakatsugawa, Gifu Prefecture, Japan, operated by Central Japan Railway Company (JR Tōkai).

Lines

Layout
The station has one ground-level  side platform and one ground-level island platform connected by a footbridge. The station is attended.

Platforms

Adjacent stations

|-
!colspan=5|

History
Sakashita Station was opened on 1 August 1908. On 1 April 1987, it became part of JR Tōkai.

Passenger statistics
In fiscal 2014, the station was used by an average of 524 passengers daily (boarding passengers only).

Surrounding area
Former Sakashita Town Hall
Sakashita Elementary School

See also
 List of Railway Stations in Japan

References

External links

Railway stations in Japan opened in 1908
Railway stations in Gifu Prefecture
Stations of Central Japan Railway Company
Chūō Main Line
Nakatsugawa, Gifu